A bugler is someone who plays the bugle.

Bugler may also refer to:

People
 Brendan Bugler (born 1985), Irish hurler

Brands and enterprises
 Bugler (tobacco), a brand of tobacco

Other uses
 Bugler (rank), a former military rank
 Bugler (BSA), a position in the Boy Scouts of America